Live at Rhino Records is a live album by the punk band Angry Samoans, recorded in 1979 and released in 1990. The first two tracks were included on re-releases of their debut album Inside My Brain.

Track listing
"Too Animalistic" – 2:04
"Right Side of My Mind" – 2:27
"Commando" – 2:24
"My Old Man's a Fatso" – 2:57
"Party Games" – 2:26
"Todd's Not Here" – 2:42
"You Stupid Asshole" – 2:32
"I'm a Pig" – 2:35
"Im in Love with Your Mom" – 2:54

Personnel
Mike Saunders – vocals, rhythm guitar
Gregg Turner – vocals
Todd Homer – bass, vocals
 – lead guitar, drums
Bill Vockeroth – drums
Gil Tolgni – engineer
Bill Inglot – mastering
Ken Perry – mastering
John Strother – mastering
John Holmstrom – cover design
Ed Flores – typesetting
Ed Colver – photography
Mike Snider – photography
Wayne Davis – liner notes

Online
"YouTube LIVE AT CAMARILLO STATE" - RETITLED and REMASTERED - Official Online release of "Live at Rhino Records" by BAD TRIP RECORDS

References

Angry Samoans albums
1979 live albums
Triple X Records live albums